José Elías Moreno (born José Elías Moreno González de Cossío on June 13, 1956, in Mexico City, Mexico) is a Mexican actor.

Moreno was born June 13, 1956, in Mexico City, Mexico. He is son of José Elías Moreno, actor of the Golden Age of Mexican cinema and Beatriz González de Cossío. He has two sisters, Beatriz, she also actress and Angelina Moreno. He was orphaned by parents at thirteen after the death of both and his maternal grandmother in a car accident.

He married with Maru de Moreno and had three children Elías, María and Andrea.

Filmography

Awards and nominations

References

External links 
 
 José Elías Moreno hijo en Alma Latina - en idioma inglés

1956 births
Living people
Mexican male telenovela actors
Mexican male television actors
Mexican male film actors
Mexican male stage actors
20th-century Mexican male actors
21st-century Mexican male actors
Male actors from Mexico City